A compact van is a type of van characterized by a flat front design, mechanicals based on a compact car, an engine placed either at the rear or between and behind the front seats, and similar in size to the VW Bus. Popular in the United States during the early 1960s, they were replaced by full-size vans at the end of the decade.  These large vans used body-on-frame construction and featured front engines under a short hood.

Japanese microvans 
In Japan, vans that comply with Kei car regulations are known as microvans.

Examples
Dodge A100
Ford E-Series (first generation)
Chevrolet Greenbrier
Chevrolet Van (first and second generations)
Lloyd LT 500

Gallery

Vans
Car body styles